The Chinese long-tailed rosefinch (Carpodacus lepidus) is a species of finch of the family Fringillidae.

It is found in China. Its natural habitats are temperate forests, subtropical or tropical moist shrubland, and temperate grassland.

References

Carpodacus
Birds of Central China
Birds described in 1877
Taxa named by Émile Oustalet